Olimpia was an American soccer club based in New Britain, Connecticut that was a member of the American Soccer League.

Year-by-year

American Soccer League (1933–1983) teams
Defunct soccer clubs in Connecticut